Enfield Town is one of three northern termini of the Lea Valley lines on the London Overground network in England. It is the most central of several stations in the London Borough of Enfield, north London. It is  down the line from London Liverpool Street, the southern terminus.

Its three-letter station code is ENF and it is in Travelcard zone 5. In 2015 the line and Enfield Town station were transferred from Abellio Greater Anglia operation to London Overground and added to the Tube map.

History
The station was opened on 1 March 1849 by the Eastern Counties Railways as Enfield. It was renamed Enfield Town on 1 April 1886.

A house which had stood on the site since the late 17th century is said to have been the birthplace of Isaac D'Israeli, father of Benjamin Disraeli. It later became a school, at which John Keats was educated. It then became the original station-house before being demolished in 1872. The fine 17th-century brickwork facade, once attributed to Christopher Wren, was dismantled, and reconstructed at South Kensington Museum.

Its place was taken by a brick station building with an attached station-master's house and a walled forecourt. This in turn was replaced in 1957 by the present building by the British Railways architect H. H. Powell.

Operation of the station was transferred from National Express to Abellio Greater Anglia in 2012, and again in 2015 from Abellio Greater Anglia to London Overground.

Stations in Enfield 
Enfield Town is also served by the Hertford Loop Line with a station at Enfield Chase on the opposite side of the town centre. The nearest station on the West Anglia Main Line is at Ponders End. Enfield Lock is another main line station in the north of the town, on the  branch of the Lea Valley Lines.

Services
The typical off-peak service from the station is two trains per hour to/from London Liverpool Street. At peak times four trains per hour serve the station, and on Tottenham Hotspur Football Club match days there are additional trains, which do not call at all stations along the line.

Connections
London Buses routes 121, 191, 192, 231, 307, 313, 317, 456, W8 and school route 629 serve the station.

Accidents 
There have been at least three incidents of trains colliding with the buffer stops, including:

 8 September 1850 – an Eastern Counties Railway passenger train collided with the buffers. The cause was determined to be a combination of brake failure and excessive speed.
 17 October 1893 – a Great Eastern Railway locomotive collided with the buffers.
 12 October 2021 – an 8-car Class 710 train (headed by 710124) forming a London Overground service from Liverpool Street failed to stop at the buffers at the end of Platform 2, crashing through them and lifting the front car off the tracks. Seventy-five passengers were evacuated from the train, while the driver and one passenger were injured. Following a post-crash drugs test that allegedly revealed traces of cocaine, the driver was arrested on suspicion of being unfit to work on a transport system through drink or drugs.

References

External links

Railway stations in the London Borough of Enfield
Former Great Eastern Railway stations
Railway stations in Great Britain opened in 1849
1849 establishments in England
Enfield, London
Railway stations served by London Overground